The Perfect LUV Tape is the fourth mixtape by American rapper Lil Uzi Vert. It was released on July 31, 2016 by Atlantic Records and Generation Now. The album features productions from Cubeatz, Don Cannon, DP Beats, Ike Beatz, Lyle LeDuff, Maaly Raw, Nard & B, Metro Boomin, XL Eagle and Zaytoven. The mixtape is considered a spiritual successor to Lil Uzi Vert vs. the World as it retains subtle references to the mixtape, as well as the graphic novel series Scott Pilgrim, on its cover art. The cover art was created by Eryck Sakutaro. The song "Do What I Want" has been featured in the soundtrack for the video game "NBA 2K18".

Track listing
Credits were adapted from the album's liner notes.

Notes
  signifies a co-producer
  signifies an uncredited co-producer

Personnel
Credits were adapted from the album's liner notes.

Technical
 Kesha "K. Lee" Lee – recording , mixing 
 Don Cannon – mixing 
 Chris Athens – mastering 

Additional personnel
 Don Cannon – album producer
 Carolyn Tracey – project manager
 Farris Knudsen – cover art design
 Matt Meiners – package design

Charts

Weekly charts

Year-end charts

Certifications

References

2016 mixtape albums
Atlantic Records albums
Albums produced by Don Cannon
Albums produced by Nard & B
Albums produced by Metro Boomin
Albums produced by Zaytoven
Albums produced by Cubeatz
Lil Uzi Vert albums
Cloud rap albums